Nakas also known as Maly Nakas, is a mountain in the Southern Urals, Russian Federation. Its largest part is in Orenburg Oblast, with a small section in Bashkortostan.

Geography

The Nakas rises in northern Tyulgansky District, near the border with Bashkortostan. Despite the lack of pronounced relief the Nakas forms an important drainage divide, separating the basins of the Belaya, Salmysh and Bolshoy Ik rivers.

Flora
Nakas is a relatively woody area; its oak and linden forests stand out in the surrounding steppes of the region.
The Nakas includes the Tugustemirov Forest, a protected area with a number of tree and rare plant species.

See also
List of highest points of Russian federal subjects
List of mountains and hills of Russia

References

External links

«ПО СЛЕДАМ ЭКСПЕДИЦИЙ ВОСЬМИДЕСЯТЫХ». ПРИРОДНОЕ НАСЛЕДИЕ ОРЕНБУРЖЬЯ. ТЮЛЬГАНСКИЙ РАЙОН

Ural Mountains
Landforms of Orenburg Oblast
ba:Наҡаҫ (тау, Ырымбур өлкәһе)